La Chapelle-Rablais is a commune in the Seine-et-Marne department in the Île-de-France region in north-central France.

Its inhabitants are called the Capello-Rablaisiens.

Geography

Location 
La Chapelle-Rablais is located in the heart of Brie, 8 km (4.97 miles) southwest of Nangis.

Bordering municipalities

Geology and relief 
The town is classified in seismicity zone 1, corresponding to a very low seismicity.

Hydrography 
The municipality's hydrographic system consists of nine referenced rivers:

 the Almont (or ru d'Ancœur or ru de Courtenain), which is 42.15  km long and a tributary of the Seine, as well as;
 the Courtenain arm, 0.53  km  ;
 the ditch 01 of the Grand Buisson du Mée, 1.35  km, and;
 Mauny stream 01, 1.16  km, tributaries of the Almont;
 the ditch 01 of the Bois de Putemuse, 1.04  km  , tributary of the stream 01 of Mauny;
 the Ru de Villefermoy, 8.19  km  ;
 the Ru des Prés des Vallées, 3.97  km  , and;
 the ditch 02 of the Bois de la Chapelle, 3.61  km, and;
 the ditch 01 of the Forêt Domaniale de Villefermoy, 2.95  km, which merges with the ru de Villefermoy.

Communication and Transport Routes 

The closest station to the town is the Nangis station on the Paris-Est - Provins line of the Transilien Paris-Est network. This line is now served by new Bombardier B 82500 dual-energy trains .

Urbanism

Localities, deviations and districts 
The town has 47 administrative localities listed including Les Montils, and Les Moyeux .

Land use 

In 2018, the territory of the municipality was 53.4% being forest land, 40.3% arable land, 4.6% of urbanized areas and 1.7% of artificial green spaces that were of non-agricultural purpose

See also 
Communes of the Seine-et-Marne department

References

External links

1999 Land Use, from IAURIF (Institute for Urban Planning and Development of the Paris-Île-de-France région) 
 

Communes of Seine-et-Marne